Robert Krieps (15 October 1922 – 1 August 1990) was a Luxembourgish politician.  He served as the President of the Luxembourg Socialist Workers' Party from 1980 until 1985, as well as serving in the Luxembourgish cabinet under both Gaston Thorn and Jacques Santer.

Krieps was the son of Ernestine (Ehlinger) and Adolphe Krieps. He was married to Renée Ketter. He was the grandfather of Luxembourgish actress Vicky Krieps.

Krieps championed abolition of the death penalty which was accomplished in 1979.

References

|-

|-

|-

1922 births
1990 deaths
Dalheim
Ministers for Justice of Luxembourg
Ministers for the Environment of Luxembourg
Members of the Chamber of Deputies (Luxembourg)
Luxembourg Socialist Workers' Party politicians
Luxembourgian jurists
Luxembourg Socialist Workers' Party MEPs
MEPs for Luxembourg 1989–1994
Hinzert concentration camp survivors
Anti–death penalty activists